Carex formosa, sometimes called handsome sedge, is a species of sedge that is native to North America. It is listed as an endangered species in Minnesota, New Jersey, and Pennsylvania, as threatened in Connecticut, Massachusetts, New York, and Wisconsin, and as presumed extirpated in Ohio.

References

formosa
Flora of North America